Bad Girls is a 2012 Taiwan romance comedy film starring Ella Chen and Mike He. With Chris Wang, Da Yuan, Beatrice Fang, Jack Kao, Hui-Chen Pan and Toyoharu Kitamura in supporting roles. Directed by Seven Wong.

The movie is about a High School brutish tomboy who accidentally becomes the lead actress of a romantic teen idol movie and falls in love with Taiwan's top male idol.

Plot
Dan (Ella Chen) is a high school tomboy who has developed a mindset that most males are bad and like to bully females because of watching her mother cried over a "bad man movie" when she was young, ever since then she has stood up to any males that bully females. Together with her friends Pei (Da Yuan) and Mi (Beatrice Fang) they formed a group calling themselves "Bad Girls" to stand up for all females that are bullied by males. One day at Dan's school a film crew along with Taiwan's #1 male idol Justin (Mike He) is there to film a romance idol movie, while chasing her younger sister around her school for making fun of her, Dan accidentally stumbles on to the filming area without noticing and injures the lead actress Jessica (Mandy Wei). Justin suggest that Dan become the new lead actress to compensate for injuring Jessica. Dan refuses, denying that she had any fault in what happened but when her school principal threatens to call her mother to school Dan agrees to being the new lead actress. At first she thinks filming a movie will be a piece of cake until she has to put in a lot of effort in acting for her role and experiencing the behind the scenes of what it takes to make a movie. As filming progresses she gets to know Justin better and realizes that his passion is not being an actor but baking. She also starts falling for Justin and realizes that not all males are as bad as she thinks.

Cast
Ella Chen 陳嘉樺 as Dan 阿丹
Mike He 賀軍翔 as Justin 贾斯汀
Da Yuan 林盈臻 as Pei 佩佩
Beatrice Fang 方志友 as Mi 小米
Jack Kao 高捷 as Justin's uncle Matthew and Manager 馬修
Hui-Chen Pan 潘麗麗 as Dan's mother 丹媽
Chris Wang 宥勝 as the makeup artist 小捲哥
Toyoharu Kitamura 北村豐晴 as film director 胖導
Megan Wan 萬萱琪 as Dan's younger sister 小希
Mandy Wei 魏蔓 as Jessica the original lead actress 潔西卡
Chu Lu-hao 朱陸豪 as Dan's father 丹爸
Pao-Chun Wu 吳寶春 as Justin's father 賈斯汀爸
Ying Wei-min 應蔚民 as Mr. Hsieh the town's Mayor 鎮長
Mandy Peng 彭曼淩 as Young Dan 小阿丹
Daniel Bi 畢曉海 as Young Justin 小賈斯汀
Ariel Li 李柏萱 as Young Pei 小佩佩
Katrina Yu 余若晴 as Young Mi 小小米
Kerr Hsu 許時豪 as movie extra who does not cooperate 那個誰
Blair Chang 張珮瑩(小8) as the idol romance film producer 劇中製片
Cin-Yu Pan 潘親御 as boy bully 潘帥

Soundtrack
Bad Girls 坏女孩 by Ella Chen 陳嘉樺
Love This Place 初戀的地方 by Teresa Teng 鄧麗君
What Is Love 愛像什麼 by Ella Chen 陳嘉樺
Know Me Before You Love Me by Ella Chen 陳嘉樺 ft. Tank
I Am What I Am 我就是我 by Ella Chen 陳嘉樺

Filming locations
New Taipei City, Danshui District - Tam-Shui Vocational High School 新北市淡水區淡水商工
New Taipei City, Rueifang District -  Rueifang District New Taipei City Park 新北市瑞芳區侯硐園區
 Jingtong railway station in Pingxi District, New Taipei

External links 

Yahoo! movie page
official facebook page
official blog page

2012 films
2010s Mandarin-language films
Taiwanese romantic comedy films
2012 romantic comedy films